Dharma is a fictional comic book character distributed by DC Comics and is the leader of the Shadow Cabinet. An original character from Milestone Comics, he first appeared in Hardware #11 (January 1993), and was created by Dwayne McDuffie, Robert L. Washington III, and Denys Cowan.

Fictional character biography

Milestone Universe
Dharma, otherwise known as Harry Chawney, has the power to perceive the past and future of any object he touches. He has perceived countless apocalypses, and is ruthless in acting to prevent them, whatever the cost. In theory, he knows the ultimate consequences of whatever action he sends his operatives to perform; however, the impossibility of considering every factor has led to his fear that he may be causing the very disasters he is trying to prevent - in the words of one agent: "What about the man who died? His future could have been important too. Did you check?", to which he was forced to respond: "I can't think about that right now".

The Cabinet makes an appearance in Blood Syndicate #20 when Dharma fires Oro, who has been a Syndicate associate, police officer, and a Shadow Cabinet operative. He is allowed to keep his costume and receives one month severance pay deposited directly into his bank account. Dharma even gives Oro advice to "take the left" as Oro teleports out.

The teleportation technology is maintained by powerful telekinetic and engineer Thomas Hague, better known as "Mechanic". Another notable employee is Payback, a spy for the independent superhero Icon. Icon also has evidence that Dharma had been involved in the 'Big Bang', a riot which, due to altered tear gas, ended with dozens of fatalities and superpowers granted to the survivors.

He would not treat further departures from the Cabinet as gracefully as Oro's. When Cabinet operatives Iota, Donner, and Blitzen leave to form the unofficial team Heroes, Dharma sends a Cabinet attack squad. This group is led by Iron Butterfly.

Milestone Forever
The truth of Dharma's action are shown. It is revealed that he was responsible for the Big Bang, hoping to create powerful beings capable of preventing a fast approaching apocalypse whose cause he could not determine. When his last two prospects (Hardware and Static), fail to meet his expectations, he turns to the only course he believes is left open to him, awakening and harnessing the powers of the god-like being called Rift. The very act of absorbing the being's powers causes widespread destruction to the universe, destroying the Dakotaverse. Thus the cause of the apocalypse he foresaw was his own attempts to stop it, although not all is lost, as his new powers will allow him the opportunity to bring about his universe's rebirth. The effects of Darkseid's death during Final Crisis of a neighboring universe gives the chance to merge the remnants of the Dakotaverse into the DC Universe, retroactively combining their histories, and giving the Milestone characters the chance to live anew. Officially only Icon, Superman, and Dharma himself even recall Rift and know the truth of Milestone's existence. Dharma is currently concentrating on keeping the worlds merged. This, according to Dharma, could take months or even years before it is permanent.

Powers and abilities
Dharma possesses incredibly powerful precognitive abilities. When he touches a personal object, Dharma can see all events that occur in its past and future. This ability extends as far as the entire Earth itself or something as small as a bead.
Not only can he see an object's future, he can see his own and his universe's future.
This power extends to the object's past as well. Hence, any place it has been or anything that has been done to it is clear to Dharma. When he focuses his psychometric on a certain person he can not only see their future and past but also understand and therefore manipulate their abilities.  Dharma is completely blind, but compensates by using his powers to guide him.

Dharma has been able to see the beginning of the universe and all that goes on in the present. At a certain point in the future (its "end"), he sees only destruction of his universe. This blind spot prevents Dharma from seeing what role he will play or what outcome happens after the destruction.

After absorbing Rift's powers Dharma gained the ability to alter reality and bend dimensions. At one point, in the original Milestone world, he absorbed his sisters known as Plus. This gave him the ability to control a living energy field that could be used for offensive as well as defensive purposes. It is unclear whether that power transferred over in the merge.

See also
 Shadow Cabinet (comics)

References

External links
Shadow Cabinet Bios - Shadow Cabinet Bios page, part of Milestone the Milestone section of International Hero.co.uk
The Milestone Rave - includes a Shadow Cabinet comic book index and issue details.
 Shadow Cabinet at the DC Database Project

Characters created by Dwayne McDuffie
Fictional characters with precognition
DC Comics male superheroes